Carbon (6C) has 15 known isotopes, from  to , of which  and  are stable. This is also the only carbon radioisotope found in nature, as trace quantities are formed cosmogenically by the reaction  +  →  + . All other radioisotopes have half-lives under 20 seconds, most less than 200 milliseconds. Light isotopes tend to decay into isotopes of boron and heavy ones tend to decay into isotopes of nitrogen.

List of isotopes

|-
| 
| style="text-align:right" | 6
| style="text-align:right" | 2
| 
| []
| 2p
| 
| 0+
|
|
|-
| rowspan=3|
| rowspan=3 style="text-align:right" | 6
| rowspan=3 style="text-align:right" | 3
| rowspan=3|
| rowspan=3|
| β+
| 
| rowspan=3|3/2−
| rowspan=3|
| rowspan=3|
|-
| β+α
| 
|-
| β+p
| 
|-
| 
| style="text-align:right" | 6
| style="text-align:right" | 4
| 
| 
| β+
| 
| 0+
|
|
|-
| rowspan=1|
| rowspan=1 style="text-align:right" | 6
| rowspan=1 style="text-align:right" | 5
| rowspan=1 |
| rowspan=1 |
| β+
| 
| rowspan=1 |3/2−
| rowspan=1 |
| rowspan=1 |
|-
| style="text-indent:1em" |
| colspan=3 style="text-indent:2em" |
|
| p ?
|  ?
| 1/2+
|
|
|-
| 
| style="text-align:right" | 6
| style="text-align:right" | 6
| 12 exactly
| colspan=3 align=center|Stable
| 0+
| [, ]
|-
| 
| style="text-align:right" | 6
| style="text-align:right" | 7
| 
| colspan=3 align=center|Stable
| 1/2−
| [, ]
|-
| 
| style="text-align:right" | 6
| style="text-align:right" | 8
| 
| 
| β−
| 
| 0+
| Trace
| < 10−12
|-
| style="text-indent:1em" |
| colspan="3" style="text-indent:2em" |
|
| IT
| 
| (2−)
|
|
|-
| 
| style="text-align:right" | 6
| style="text-align:right" | 9
| 
| 
| β−
| 
| 1/2+
|
|
|-
| rowspan=2|
| rowspan=2 style="text-align:right" | 6
| rowspan=2 style="text-align:right" | 10
| rowspan=2|
| rowspan=2|
| β−n
| 
| rowspan=2|0+
| rowspan=2|
| rowspan=2|
|-
| β−
| 
|-
| rowspan=3|
| rowspan=3 style="text-align:right" | 6
| rowspan=3 style="text-align:right" | 11
| rowspan=3|
| rowspan=3|
| β−
| 
| rowspan=3|3/2+
| rowspan=3|
| rowspan=3|
|-
| β−n
| 
|-
| β−2n ?
|  ?
|-
| rowspan=3|
| rowspan=3 style="text-align:right" | 6
| rowspan=3 style="text-align:right" | 12
| rowspan=3|
| rowspan=3|
| β−
| 
| rowspan=3|0+
| rowspan=3|
| rowspan=3|
|-
| β−n
| 
|-
| β−2n ?
|  ?
|-
| rowspan=3|
| rowspan=3 style="text-align:right" | 6
| rowspan=3 style="text-align:right" | 13
| rowspan=3|
| rowspan=3|
| β−n
| 
| rowspan=3|1/2+
| rowspan=3|
| rowspan=3|
|-
| β−
| 
|-
| β−2n
| 
|-
| rowspan=3|
| rowspan=3 style="text-align:right" | 6
| rowspan=3 style="text-align:right" | 14
| rowspan=3|
| rowspan=3|
| β−n
| 
| rowspan=3|0+
| rowspan=3|
| rowspan=3|
|-
| β−2n (< )
| 
|-
| β− (> )
| 
|-
| ?
| style="text-align:right" | 6
| style="text-align:right" | 15
| #
| < 
| n ?
|  ?
| 1/2+#
|
|
|-
| rowspan=3|
| rowspan=3 style="text-align:right" | 6
| rowspan=3 style="text-align:right" | 16
| rowspan=3|
| rowspan=3|
| β−n
| 
| rowspan=3|0+
| rowspan=3|
| rowspan=3|
|-
| β−2n (< )
| 
|-
| β− (> )
| 
|-
| ?
| style="text-align:right" | 6
| style="text-align:right" | 17
| #
| 
| n ?
| ?
| 3/2+#
| 
|

Carbon-11
This decay mainly occurs due to positron emission, with around 0.19–0.23% of decays instead occurring by electron capture.

 →  +  +  + 
 +  →  +  + 

It is produced from nitrogen in a cyclotron by the reaction
 +  →  (122 seconds half-life);  →  + 

Carbon-11 is commonly used as a radioisotope for the radioactive labeling of molecules in positron emission tomography. Among the many molecules used in this context are the radioligands []DASB and []Cimbi-5.

Natural isotopes

Isotopically,  constitutes a negligible part; but, since it is radioactive with a half-life of  years, it is radiometrically detectable.

Paleoclimate

Plants find it easier to use the lighter isotopes when they convert sunlight and carbon dioxide into food. Where cold waters well up from the depths (such as in the North Atlantic), the water carries  back up with it. So, when the ocean was less stratified than today, there was much more  in the skeletons of surface-dwelling species. Other indicators of past climate include the presence of tropical species, coral growths rings, etc.

Tracing food sources and diets
The quantities of the different isotopes can be measured by mass spectrometry and compared to a standard; the result (e.g. the delta of the  = δ) is expressed as parts per thousand (‰):
 ‰

Stable carbon isotopes in carbon dioxide are utilized differentially by plants during photosynthesis. Grasses in temperate climates (barley, rice, wheat, rye, and oats, plus sunflower, potato, tomatoes, peanuts, cotton, sugar beet, and most trees and their nuts or fruits, roses, and Kentucky bluegrass) follow a C3 photosynthetic pathway that will yield δ13C values averaging about −26.5‰. Grasses in hot arid climates (maize in particular, but also millet, sorghum, sugar cane, and crabgrass) follow a C4 photosynthetic pathway that produces δ13C values averaging about −12.5‰.

It follows that eating these different plants will affect the δ13C values in the consumer's body tissues. If an animal (or human) eats only C3 plants, their δ13C values will be from −18.5 to −22.0‰ in their bone collagen and −14.5‰ in the hydroxylapatite of their teeth and bones.

In contrast, C4 feeders will have bone collagen with a value of −7.5‰ and hydroxylapatite value of −0.5‰.

In actual case studies, millet and maize eaters can easily be distinguished from rice and wheat eaters. Studying how these dietary preferences are distributed geographically through time can illuminate migration paths of people and dispersal paths of different agricultural crops. However, human groups have often mixed C3 and C4 plants (northern Chinese historically subsisted on wheat and millet), or mixed plant and animal groups together (for example, southeastern Chinese subsisting on rice and fish).

See also
 Cosmogenic isotopes
 Environmental isotopes
 Isotopic signature
 Radiocarbon dating

References

 
Carbon
Carbon